The twelfth series of The Great British Bake Off began airing on 21 September 2021. It is presented by Noel Fielding and Matt Lucas, and judged by returning judges Paul Hollywood and Prue Leith. The bakers were announced on 14 September 2021.

The series was won by Giuseppe Dell'Anno, with Chigs Parmar and Crystelle Pereira finishing as the runners-up. Dell'Anno is the first Italian winner of the programme. Baker Freya Cox, who was the series' first vegan contestant, published the cookbook Simply Vegan Baking in 2022.

Bakers

Results summary 

Colour key:

Episodes

Episode 1: Cake 
For the signature challenge, the bakers were tasked with making 12 decorative mini rolls, in two hours. The technical challenge, set by Prue, required the bakers to make a malt loaf served with homemade butter, in two hours. In the showstopper challenge, the bakers were given four hours to create an anti-gravity illusion cake, representing a precious memory.

Episode 2: Biscuits 
For the signature challenge, the bakers were tasked with making 24 identical Brandy snaps, in two hours. The technical challenge, set by Paul, required the bakers to make 12 sandwiched jammy biscuits, consisting of two baked biscuits, jam, and buttercream, in one hour and 45 minutes. For the showstopper challenge, the bakers needed to create a 3D biscuit replica of a favorite childhood toy. The replica needed to have an interactive element.

Episode 3: Bread 
The signature challenge tasked the bakers with making a focaccia in 2 hours 45 minutes. The technical challenge, set by Paul, tasked the bakers with making 15 olive and cheese ciabatta breadsticks, served with a tzatziki dip, in two hours. For the showstopper challenge, the bakers were asked to create a 3D themed display using milk bread, in four hours and 30 minutes.

Episode 4: Desserts 

The signature challenge tasked the bakers with making a beautifully decorated Pavlova, in two hours 45 minutes. For the technical challenge, set by Prue, asked the bakers to make 4 individual sticky toffee puddings, served with sticky toffee sauce, two Tuile triangles, and a creme anglaise. The bakers had 90 minutes. For the showstopper challenge, the bakers were given the enormous task of making a celebratory joconde imprime dessert, composed of a highly decorated joconde sponge wrapped around at least two elements, in four hours and 30 minutes.

Episode 5: German 
The signature challenge tasked the bakers with making two types of 12 German biscuits, which needed to be dipped, coated, or decorated, in two hours 15 minutes. For the technical challenge, Prue asked the bakers to make a Prinzregententorte, consisting of 8 thin layers of genoises sponge sandwiched with chocolate cream, coated with a shiny chocolate ganache, decorated with rosettes and tempered chocolate crowns, in two hours 45 minutes. The showstopper gave the bakers four and a half hours to produce a yeast-leavened cake. The cakes must be at least two-tiered and inspired by the yeasted cakes popular in Germany.

Episode 6: Pastry 
For the signature, the bakers were tasked with making two batches of glazed or iced chouxnuts: 6 filled, 6 not filled. For the technical challenge, Paul required the bakers to make a large baklava. They were asked to layer Filo pastry with a pistachio and walnut filling, cut into a star design, in two hours and 45 minutes. For the showstopper, the bakers were given the intricate task of making a Terrine pie, in four and a half hours. The pies needed to have an ornated pastry decoration on the outside and a neat pattern or design when cut open.

Episode 7: Caramel 
For the first signature challenge, the bakers were required to produce a sharing-sized decorative caramel tart in 2 hours and 30 minutes. The technical challenge was set by Paul where the bakers were tasked to make 10 caramel biscuit bars in 1 hour and 30 minutes. For the showstopper challenge, the bakers were required to make a caramel-flavored dessert with a sugar-work dome or sphere in 4 hours and 30 minutes.

Episode 8: Free-from 
For the signature bake, the bakers were given the challenge of baking 8 dairy-free ice cream sandwiches. They were given 3 hours for the bake. For the technical challenge was to make eight identical vegan sausage rolls accompanied by a sticky red onion chutney, in two hours. In the showstopper, the bakers needed to make a Gluten-free Celebration Cake with at least two tiers. They were given four and a half hours for the bake.

Episode 9: Pâtisserie (Semi-final) 
In the semifinal signature challenge, the bakers were tasked to make 8 pâtisserie-style layered slices in 3 hours. For the technical bake, set by Prue, the bakers are tasked in making a Sablé Breton Tart, consisting of a sablé breton pastry base, topped with raspberry confiture, piped with pistachio crème mousseline, filled with fresh berries and topped with glided meringue kisses and chocolate curls, all in 2 hours and 45 minutes. A themed banquet display consisting of a crafted edible centrepiece surrounded by least 12 individual entremets desserts was set as the showstopper, the bakers are given 5 hours.

Jurgen's elimination received public backlash following the episode's airing with OFCOM receiving 115 complaints.

Episode 10: Final 
The finalists were set the task of making a carrot cake in 2 hours and 15 minutes for the signature challenge. For the final technical challenge, set by Paul, the bakers were given 2 hours and 30 minutes to create 12 Belgian buns filled with sultanas and lemon curd, with only 2 instructions given. For the ultimate showstopper challenge, the bakers were tasked to make a Mad Hatter tea party display with sweet and savory afternoon tea treats, showcasing at least 4 different baking disciplines in 4 1/2 hours. The judges expect to see the madness feel of Alice in Wonderland in the bakes.

Specials

Two specials were commissioned for the festive season:

The Great Christmas Bake Off 

The Great Christmas Bake Off featured It's a Sin's Olly Alexander, Nathaniel Curtis, Lydia West and Shaun Dooley.

The signature challenge required the bakers to make a Christmas Dinner's leftovers pie, in 2 hours, it can be made with any type of pastry, but the fillings must be made with leftovers from the baker's favorite Christmas Dinner. Prue's technical challenge tasked the bakers with making a chocolate Yule Log, in 1 hours and 15 minutes. The bakers were given 3 hours to make a Christmas Tree out of biscuit or meringue for the showstopper challenge.

The Great New Year Bake Off 

The Great New Year Bake Off features Jon Jenkins and Kim-Joy Hewlett from Series 9, along with Rowan Williams and Hermine from Series 11.

For the signature challenge, the bakers were asked to create 12 buns, suitable for a New Year's day Breakfast, the buns can be any flavor or shape, but must be yeasted and feature a topping of the baker's choice, 3 hours are given. Paul's technical challenge required the bakers to make a New Years Eve cake inspired by the traditional Greek Vasilopita, consisting of a perfectly baked lemon mahleb and mastika sponge and decorated with water icing, lemon curd and crystallized citrus peel in 1 hour and 30 minutes. A shadow box winter scene with a frame, to all be created with at least 3 different biscuits in 4 hours is the showstopper.

Ratings 
Bake Off launched with 5.7 million viewers and a 30.8% share – its lowest overnight rating since its move to Channel 4 in 2017 – down 1.3 million on 2020.  However, it was the show's biggest ever launch episode on Channel 4 in terms of younger viewers, securing 61.9% of all young viewers watching TV at the time of broadcast.

References 

Series 12
2021 British television seasons